The Danish resistance movement, with the assistance of many Danish citizens, managed to evacuate 7,220 of Denmark's 7,800 Jews, plus 686 non-Jewish spouses, by sea to nearby neutral Sweden during the Second World War. The arrest and deportation of Danish Jews was ordered by the German leader Adolf Hitler, but the efforts to save them started earlier due to the plans being leaked on September 28, 1943 by German diplomat Georg Ferdinand Duckwitz.

The rescue is considered one of the largest actions of collective resistance to aggression in the countries occupied by Germany during the Second World War. As a result of the rescue, and of the following Danish intercession on behalf of the 464 Danish Jews who were captured and deported to the Theresienstadt concentration camp in the Protectorate of Bohemia and Moravia, over 99% of Denmark's Jewish population survived the Holocaust.

"Model protectorate" (1940–1943) 

On April 9, 1940, Denmark and Norway were invaded by Nazi Germany. Realizing that successful armed resistance was impossible, and wishing to avoid civilian casualties, the Danish government surrendered after a few token skirmishes on the morning of the invasion.

The Nazi government stated that its occupation of Denmark was a measure taken against the Allies and that Germany did not intend to disturb the political independence of the country. Because the Danish government promised "loyal cooperation" with the Germans, the occupation of Denmark was relatively mild at first. German propaganda even referred to Denmark as the "model protectorate", earning the nickname the Cream Front, due to the relative ease of the occupation and copious number of dairy products. King Christian X retained his throne, and the Danish government, the Rigsdag (parliament) and the national courts continued to function. Even censorship of radio and the press was administered by the Danish government, rather than by the occupying German civil and military authorities.

During the early years of the occupation, Danish officials repeatedly insisted to the German occupation authorities that there was no "Jewish problem" in Denmark. The Germans recognized that discussion of the "Jewish question" in Denmark was a possibly explosive issue, which had the potential to destroy the "model" relationship between Denmark and Germany and, in turn, cause negative political and economic consequences for Germany. In addition, the German Reich relied substantially upon Danish agriculture, which supplied meat and butter to 3.6 million Germans in 1942. As a result, when officials in Berlin attempted to implement anti-Jewish measures in Denmark, even ideologically committed Nazis, such as Reich Plenipotentiary Werner Best, followed a strategy of avoiding and deferring any discussion of Denmark's Jews.

In late 1941, during the visit of Danish foreign minister Erik Scavenius to Berlin, German authorities there (including Hermann Göring) insisted that Denmark choose not to avoid its "Jewish problem". A Danish anti-Semitic newspaper used these statements as an opportunity for an attack on the country's Jews; shortly thereafter, arsonists attempted to start a fire at the Great Synagogue in Copenhagen. The Danish state responded robustly; the courts imposed stiff fines and jail sentences on the editors and would-be arsonists, and the government took further administrative action. Denmark's punishment of anti-Semitic crimes during the occupation was interpreted by the German authorities in Denmark as signaling that the government would be uncooperative toward any future measures that might be taken against Denmark's Jews by the occupiers.

In mid-1943, Danes saw the German defeats in the Battle of Stalingrad and in North Africa as an indication that having to live under German rule was no longer a long-term certainty. At the same time, the Danish resistance movement was becoming more assertive in its underground press and its increased sabotage activities. During the summer, several nationwide strikes led to armed confrontations between Danes and German troops. In the wake of increased resistance activities and riots, the German occupation authorities presented the Danish government with an ultimatum on August 28, 1943; they demanded a ban on strikes, a curfew, and the punishment of sabotage with the death penalty. Deeming these terms unacceptable and a violation of national sovereignty, the Danish government declared a state of emergency. Some 100 prominent Danes were taken hostage, including the Chief Rabbi Max Friediger and a dozen other Jews. In response, the Danish government resigned on August 29, 1943. The result was direct administration of Denmark by the German authorities; this direct form of rule meant that the "model protectorate" had come to an end—and with it, the protection the Danish government had provided for the country's Jews.

Deportation order and rescue 
Without the uncooperative Danish government to impede them, Denmark's German occupiers began planning the deportation to Nazi concentration camps of the 7,800 or so Jews in Denmark. German diplomat Georg Ferdinand Duckwitz unsuccessfully attempted to assure safe harbor for the Danish Jews in Sweden; the Swedish government told Duckwitz it would accept the Danish Jews only if approved by the Nazis, who ignored the request for approval. On September 28, 1943, Duckwitz leaked word of the plans for the operation against Denmark's Jews to Hans Hedtoft, chairman of the Danish Social Democratic Party. Hedtoft contacted the Danish Resistance Movement and the head of the Jewish community, C. B. Henriques, who in turn alerted the acting chief rabbi, Marcus Melchior. At the early morning services, on September 29, the day prior to the Rosh Hashanah services, Jews were warned by Rabbi Melchior of the planned German action and urged to go into hiding immediately and to spread the word to all their Jewish friends and relatives.

The early phases of the rescue were improvised. When Danish civil servants at several levels in different ministries learned of the German plan to round up all Danish Jews, they independently pursued various measures to find the Jews and hide them. Some simply contacted friends and asked them to go through telephone books and warn those with Jewish-sounding names to go into hiding. Most Jews hid for several days or weeks, uncertain of their fate.

Although the majority of Danish Jews were in hiding, it is likely that most would have been caught eventually if safe passage to Sweden had not been secured. Sweden had earlier been receiving Norwegian Jews with some sort of Swedish connection. But the actions to save the Norwegians were not entirely efficient, due to the lack of experience in how to deal with the German authorities. When martial law was introduced in Denmark on August 29, the Swedish Ministry for Foreign Affairs (UD) realized that the Danish Jews were in immediate danger. In a letter dated August 31, the Swedish ambassador in Copenhagen was given clearance by the Chief Legal Officer Gösta Engzell (who had represented Sweden at the 1938 Évian Conference, held to discuss Jewish refugees fleeing the Nazi regime) to issue Swedish passports in order to "rescue Danish Jews and bring them here." On October 2, the Swedish government announced in an official statement that Sweden was prepared to accept all Danish Jews in Sweden. It was a message parallel to an earlier unofficial statement made to the German authorities in Norway. Groups such as the Elsinore Sewing Club sprang up to covertly ferry Jews to safety.

The Danish physicist Niels Bohr, whose mother was Jewish, made a determined stand for his fellow countrymen in a personal appeal to the Swedish king and government ministers.  King Gustav V granted him an audience after a persuasive call from Greta Garbo, who knew Bohr. He was spirited off to Sweden, whose government arranged immediate transport for him to the United States to work on the then top-secret Manhattan Project. When Bohr arrived on Swedish soil, government representatives told him he had to board an aircraft immediately for the United States. Bohr refused. He told the officials—and eventually the king—that until Sweden announced over its airwaves and through its press that its borders would be open to receive the Danish Jews, he was not going anywhere. Bohr wrote of these events himself. As related by the historian Richard Rhodes, on September 30 Bohr persuaded Gustaf to make public Sweden's willingness to provide asylum, and on October 2 Swedish radio broadcast that Sweden was ready to receive the Jewish refugees. Rhodes and other historians interpret Bohr's actions in Sweden as being a necessary precursor without which mass rescue could not have occurred. According to Paul A. Levine, however—who does not mention the Bohr factor at all—the Swedish Ministry for Foreign Affairs acted on clear instructions given much earlier by Prime Minister Per Albin Hansson and Foreign Minister Christian Günther, following a policy already established in 1942.

The Jews were smuggled and transported out of Denmark over the Øresund strait from Zealand to Sweden—a passage of varying time depending on the specific route and the weather, but averaging under an hour on the choppy winter sea. Some were transported in large fishing boats of up to 20 tons, but others were carried to freedom in rowboats or kayaks. The ketch Albatros was one of the ships used to smuggle Jews to Sweden. Some refugees were smuggled inside freight rail cars on the regular ferries between Denmark and Sweden, this route being suited for the very young or old who were too weak to endure a rough sea passage. Danish Resistance Movement operatives had broken into empty freight cars sealed by the Germans after inspection, helped refugees onto the cars, and then resealed the cars with forged or stolen German seals to forestall further inspection.

Fishermen charged on average 1,000 Danish kroner per person for the transport, but some charged up to 50,000 kroner. The average monthly wage at the time was less than 500 kroner, and half of the rescued Jews belonged to the working class. Prices were determined by the market principles of supply and demand, as well as by the fishermen's perception of the risk. The Danish Resistance Movement took an active role in organizing the rescue and providing financing, mostly from wealthy Danes who donated large sums of money to the endeavor. In all the rescue is estimated to have cost around 20 million kroner, about half of which were paid by Jewish families and half from donations and collections.

During the first days of the rescue action, Jews moved into the many fishing harbors on the Danish coast to await passage, but officers of the Gestapo became suspicious of activity around harbors (and on the night of October 6, about 80 Jews were caught hiding in the loft of the church at Gilleleje, their hiding place having been betrayed by a Danish girl who was in love with a German soldier). Subsequent rescues had to take place from isolated points along the coast. While waiting their turn, the Jews took refuge in the woods and in cottages away from the coast, out of sight of the Gestapo.

Some of the refugees never made it to Sweden; a few chose to commit suicide; some were captured by the Gestapo en route to their point of embarkation; some 23 were lost at sea when vessels of poor seaworthiness capsized; and still others were intercepted at sea by German patrol boats. Danish harbor police and civil police often cooperated with the rescue effort. During the early stages, the Gestapo was undermanned and the German army and navy were called in to reinforce the Gestapo in its effort to prevent transportation taking place; but by and large the German military troops proved less than enthusiastic in the operation and frequently turned a blind eye to escapees. The local Germans in command, for their own political calculations and through their own inactivity, may have actually facilitated the escape.

Arrests and deportations 
In Copenhagen the deportation order was carried out on the Jewish New Year, the night of October 1–2, when the Germans assumed all Jews would be gathered at home. The roundup was organized by the SS who used two police battalions and about 50 Danish volunteer members of the Waffen SS chosen for their familiarity with Copenhagen and northern Zealand. The SS organized themselves in five-man teams, each with a Dane, a vehicle, and a list of addresses to check. Most teams found no one, but one team found four Jews on the fifth address checked. A bribe of 15,000 kroner was rejected and the cash destroyed. The arrested Jews were allowed to bring two blankets, food for three or four days, and a small suitcase. They were transported to the harbour, Langelinie, where a couple of large ships awaited them. One of the Danish Waffen-SS members believed the Jews were being sent to Danzig.

On October 2, some arrested Danish communists witnessed the deportation of about 200 Jews from Langelinie via the ship Wartheland. Of these, a young married couple were able to convince the Germans that they were not Jewish, and set free. The remainder included mothers with infants; the sick and elderly; and chief rabbi Max Friediger and the other Jewish hostages who had been placed in the Danish internment camp, Horserød, on August 28–29. They were driven below deck without their luggage while being screamed at, kicked and beaten. The Germans then took anything of value from the luggage. Their unloading the next day in Swinemünde was even more inhumane, though without fatalities. There the Jews were driven into two cattle cars, about one hundred per car. During the night, while still locked in the cattle cars, a Jewish mother cried that her child had died. For comparison the Danish communists were packed into cars with "only" fifty people in each; nevertheless, they quickly began to suffer from heat, thirst and lack of ventilation; furthermore, they had nothing to drink until they were given filthy water on October 5, shortly before being unloaded in Danzig.

Rescued by Folke Bernadotte  

Only some 580 Danish Jews failed to escape to Sweden. Some of these remained hidden in Denmark to the end of the war, a few died of accidents or committed suicide, and a handful had special permission to stay. The vast majority, 464 of the 580, were captured and sent to the Theresienstadt concentration camp in German-occupied Czechoslovakia. After these Jews' deportation, leading Danish civil servants persuaded the Germans to accept packages of food and medicine for the prisoners; furthermore, Denmark persuaded the Germans not to deport the Danish Jews to extermination camps. This was achieved by Danish political pressure, using the Danish Red Cross to frequently monitor the condition of the Danish Jews at Theresienstadt. A total of 51 Danish Jews—mostly elderly—died of disease at Theresienstadt, but in April 1945, as the war drew to a close, 425 surviving Danish Jews (a few having been born in the camp) were among the several thousand Jews rescued by an operation led by Folke Bernadotte of the Swedish Red Cross who organized the
transporting of interned Norwegians, Danes and western European inmates from German concentration camps to hospitals in Sweden. Around 15,000 people were taken to safety in the White Buses of the Bernadotte expedition. The casualties among Danish Jews during the Holocaust were among the lowest of the occupied countries of Europe. Yad Vashem records only 102 Jews from Denmark who were murdered in the Shoah.

Story of the Danes and the yellow star 

It has been popularly reported that the Nazis ordered all Danish Jews to wear an identifying yellow star, as was done elsewhere in Nazi-controlled territories. In some versions of the story, King Christian X opted to wear such a star himself and the Danish people followed his example, thus making the order unenforceable.

The story is not accurate. In fact the story about the King and the Star and other similar stories originated in the offices of the National Denmark America Association (NDAA) where a handful of Danish nationals opened a propaganda unit called "Friends of Danish Freedom and Democracy", which published a bulletin called The Danish Listening Post. This group hired Edward L. Bernays, "The father of Public Relation and Spin", as a consultant. Whether Bernays was the inventor of the story about the King and the yellow star is not known.

Although the Danish authorities cooperated with the German occupation forces, they and most Danes strongly opposed the isolation of any group within the population, especially the well-integrated Jewish community. The German action to deport Danish Jews prompted the Danish state church and all political parties except the pro-Nazi National Socialist Workers' Party of Denmark (NSWPD) immediately to denounce the action and to pledge solidarity with the Jewish fellow citizens. For the first time they openly opposed the occupation. At once the Danish bishops issued a hyrdebrev—a pastoral letter to all citizens. The letter was distributed to all Danish ministers, to be read out in every church on the following Sunday. This was in itself very unusual, for the Danish church is decentralized and non-political.

The unsuccessful German deportation attempt and the actions to save the Jews were important steps in linking the resistance movement to broader anti-Nazi sentiments in Denmark. In many ways, October 1943 and the rescuing of the Jews marked a change in most people's perception of the war and the occupation, thereby giving a "subjective-psychological" foundation for the legend.

A few days after the roundup, a small news item in the New York Daily News reported the story about the wearing of the Star of David. Later, the story gained its popularity in Leon Uris's novel Exodus and in its movie adaptation. The political theorist Hannah Arendt also mentions it during the discussion of Denmark in her book of reportage, Eichmann in Jerusalem. It persists to the present, but it is unfounded.

"Righteous among the nations" 
At their initial insistence, the Danish resistance movement wished to be honored only as a collective effort by Yad Vashem in Israel as being part of the "Righteous Among the Nations"; only a handful are individually named for that honor. Instead, the rescue of the Jews of Denmark is represented at Yad Vashem by a tree planting to the King and the Danish Resistance movement—and by an authentic fishing boat from the Danish village of Gilleleje. Similarly, the US Holocaust Museum in Washington, D.C., has on permanent exhibit an authentic rescue boat used in several crossings in the rescue of some 1400 Jews.

Georg Ferdinand Duckwitz, the German official who leaked word of the round-up, is also on the Yad Vashem list.

Partial list of Danish rescuers
While only a few Danes, mostly non-resistance members who happened to be known by the Jew he or she helped, made the Yad Vashem list, there were several hundreds, if not a few thousands, of ordinary Danes who took part in the rescue efforts. They most often worked within small spontaneously organized groups and "under cover". Known only by their fictitious names they could generally not be identified by those who were helped and thus not meet the Yad Vashem criteria for the "Righteous Among the Nations" honor. Below is a partial list of some of the more significant rescuers, both within and outside the formal resistance movement, whose names have surfaced over the years:

 Fanny Arnskov
 Knud Dyby
 Ellen Marie Christensen
 Aage and Gerda Bertelsen
 Richard and Vibeke Ege
 Jørgen Gersfelt
 Gunnar Gregersen
 Ejler Haubirk
 Steffen Hansen
 Ole Helwig
 Leif B. Hendil
 Erik Husfeldt
 Signe (Mogensen) Jansen
 Robert Jensen
 Jørgen Kieler
 Elsebeth Kieler
 Erling Kiær
 Karl Henrik Køster
 Thormod Larsen
 Gurli Larsen
 Jens Lillelund
 Steffen Lund
 Ebba Lund
 Ellen W. Nielsen
 Svend Otto Nielsen ("John")
 Robert Petersen
 Paul Kristian Brandt Rehberg
 Ole Secher
 Find Sandgren
 Svenn Seehusen
 Erik Stærmose
 Henny Sunding
 Laust Sørensen
 Henry Thomsen
 Henry Rasmussen
 Børge Rønne
 Mogens Staffeldt
 Hilbert Hansen

Explanations 

Different explanations have been advanced to explain the success of efforts to protect the Danish Jewish population in the light of less success at similar operations elsewhere in Nazi-occupied Europe:

 The German Reich plenipotentiary of Denmark, Werner Best, despite instigating the roundup via a telegram he sent to Hitler on October 8, 1943, did not act to enforce it. He was aware of the efforts by Duckwitz to have the roundup cancelled, and knew about the potential escape of the Jews to Sweden, but he turned a blind eye to it, as did the Wehrmacht (which was guarding the Danish coast), in order to preserve Germany's relationship with Denmark. According to the account of a survivor, Best himself had warned the survivor to escape.

 Logistically, the operation was relatively simple. Denmark's Jewish population was small, both in relative and absolute terms, and most of Denmark's Jews lived in or near Copenhagen, only a short sea voyage from neutral Sweden (typically ). Although hazardous, the boat ride was easier to conceal than a comparable land journey.
 Since the mid-19th century, a particular brand of romantic nationalism had evolved in Denmark. The traits of this nationalism included emphasis on the importance of "smallness", close-knit communities, and traditions—this nationalism being largely a response to Denmark's failure to assert itself as a great power and its losses in the Gunboat War and the Second War of Schleswig. Some historians, such as Leni Yahil (The Rescue of Danish Jewry: Test of a Democracy, 1969), believe that the Danish form of non-aggressive nationalism, influenced by Danish spiritual leader N. F. S. Grundtvig, encouraged the Danes to identify with the plight of the Jews, even though small-scale anti-Semitism had been present in Denmark long before the German invasion.
 Denmark's Jewish population had long been thoroughly integrated into Danish society, and some members of the small Jewish community had risen to prominence. Consequently, most Danes perceived the Nazis' action against Denmark's Jews as an affront to all Danes, and rallied to the protection of their country's citizens.
 The deportation of Jews in Denmark came one year after the deportations of Jews in Norway. That created an outrage in all of Scandinavia, alerted the Danish Jews, and pushed the Swedish government to declare that it would receive all Jews who managed to escape the Nazis.

See also 
 Denmark in World War II
Rescue of the Bulgarian Jews
History of Jews
Nazi war crimes
Number the Stars (1989), a work of historical fiction about the escape of Danish Jews to Sweden during World War II.
The Only Way

Notes

References 
 Bak, Sofie Lene: Nothing to Speak Of: Wartime Experiences of the Danish Jews. U. of Chicago (Museum Tuscalum Press) 2010, .
 Bertelsen, Aage. October '43. New York: Putnam, 1954.
 Buckser, Andrew. "Rescue and Cultural Context During the Holocaust: Grundtvigian Nationalism and the Rescue of the Danish Jews". Shofar 19(2), 2001. .
 
 Gulmann, Søren & Karina Søby Madsen. The Elsinore Sewing Club. Forlaget fantastiske fortællinger, 2018. .
 Herbert, Ulrich: Best. Biographische Studien über Radikalismus, Weltanschauung und Vernunft 1903–1989. Habilitationsschrift. Dietz, Bonn 1996, .
 Kieler, Jørgen. Hvorfor gjorde vi det. [Why did we do it?]. Copenhagen, Denmark, Gyldendal, 1993.
 Levine, Paul A. (1996). From Indifference to Activism: Swedish Diplomacy and the Holocaust 1938–1944. Uppsala.
 
 
 Pundik, Herbert: Die Flucht der dänischen Juden 1943 nach Schweden. Husum, 1995. .
 
 
 Vilhjálmsson, Vilhjálmur Örn (2006) "Ich weiss, was ich zu tun habe". Rambam 15:2006 (English abstract at the end of the article).
 Vilhjálmsson, Vilhjálmur Örn and Blüdnikow, Bent. "Rescue, Expulsion, and Collaboration: Denmark's Difficulties with Its World War II Past". Jewish Political Studies Review 18:3–4 (Fall 2006).

External links 
 United States Holocaust Memorial Museum: The Rescue of the Jews of Denmark
 "The Fate of the Danish Jews"
 Denmark and the Holocaust - an article in Yad Vashem resource center, by Carol Rittner
 Rescue, Expulsion, and Collaboration:Denmark's Difficulties with its World War II Past. (By Vilhjálmur Örn Vilhjálmsson and Bent Blüdnikow)
 The tip-off from a Nazi that saved my grandparents

1943 in Denmark
Danish resistance movement
Danish Righteous Among the Nations
Evacuations
Jewish Danish history
Jewish Swedish history
Rescue of Jews during the Holocaust
Sweden in World War II
The Holocaust in Denmark
The Holocaust and Sweden